Cathleen Martini (born 27 May 1982) is a German bobsledder who has competed since 2000. She won four medals in the two-woman event at the FIBT World Championships with two silvers (2007, 2008) and two bronzes (2003, 2009).

In the Bobsleigh World Cup, Martini has finished second four times in the overall two-woman standings (2004-5, 2007-8, 2008–09, 2010–11).

She was also European champion in 2004 and 2005, and has so far won 7 World Cup competitions.

At the 2010 Winter Olympics in Vancouver, Martini was disqualified when she crashed out at the final run of the two-woman event that ejected her brakewoman.

References

External links 
 
 
 

1982 births
Living people
People from Zwickau
People from Bezirk Karl-Marx-Stadt
German people of Italian descent
German female bobsledders
Sportspeople from Saxony
Olympic bobsledders of Germany
Bobsledders at the 2010 Winter Olympics
Bobsledders at the 2014 Winter Olympics
21st-century German women